A skill with prize or skill with prizes (SWP) machine is a gaming machine which provides a payout (the prize) and whose outcome depends in part on the player's skill (the skill). They are contrasted with amusement with prize machines which, while interactive, do not depend on the player's skill in determining outcome.

SWP machines are a hybrid of games of skill and games of chance; the degree to which skill versus chance determines the outcome varies between machines, and may be set by operator parameters.

Examples 
Stacker is a common free-standing merchandiser SWP machine.
In the United Kingdom, the most common class of SWP machines are quiz machines, on such platforms as the itbox, and are widely found in public houses. Indeed, "quiz machine" is often used interchangeably with "SWP" for such counter-top machines, though not all games on these devices are quiz-based: other games include Crystal Maze, based on The Crystal Maze, and Word Up.

Another class of SWP machines are free-standing machines, generally found in video arcades. These are frequently merchandisers – devices containing prizes – most commonly claw cranes, and more recently Stacker. Other examples include Barber Cut and Barber Cut Lite by Namco Bandai Games.
There are also a number of SWP games specific to Japan, such as Move Sector and Ring Magician.  Another class are redemption games, which rather than containing prizes, instead dispense tickets which can be redeemed for prizes. Some machines, such as Flamin' Finger and Stacker, can be configured as either merchandisers or redemption games.

Economics 

SWP machines are generally intended to be profitable for the operator in their own right, rather than as loss leaders; sample economics are given in reference. For example, Barber Cut is advertised as "more addicting than any other prize redemption game, and those repeat-plays will land right in your cash box!"

A problem that some vendors identify is that players may be "skeptical of any chance at winning", since many SWP games can be and are rigged to only provide payout a fraction of the time;
thus evidence that suggests that a prize has been won "convinces players that it is actually possible to win."

While SWP machines are generally not intended to be winnable by skilled players – otherwise such a player could continue to play and win and causes losses to the operator – it is sometimes possible that player skill, or using the machine in a way not anticipated by the manufacturer, can result in the game becoming winnable. This may result in service updates by the manufacturer to close the exploit. Other methods to minimize losses are discussed at claw cranes.

Regulation 

SWP machines are in a legal gray area in the United States, due to containing elements of skill and of chance, particularly since payout percentages can to a large extent be set by the operator – such setting leads to machines being described as rigged. They are generally regulated separately from games of pure chance such as slot machines; see claw vending machine: legality for statutes pertaining to claw machines. (They are legal and regulated in the United Kingdom, for example).

Claims of being largely or entirely skill-based can expose the operator to accusation of unfair practices; thus some lawyers advise operators to not advertise the machines as being skill-based.

As of November 1, 2010, all UK SWP machines must adhere to strict guidelines set down by BACTA (British Amusement Catering Trade Association) & the gambling commission. These guidelines state that there must be no element of chance within the game that can affect the outcome. There are also limits set on the level of skill needed to play, for example there must be a minimum amount of time for a player to react to the game. This ensures that manufacturers & operators cannot be accused of setting physically impossible skill levels.  Quiz machines are the easiest SWP machine type to bring to compliance with the law, as the spoiler questions that they hand out to try to enforce their percentages are still answerable if you know them.

See also 
 Amusement with prize

References 

Gaming devices
Arcade games